Kloofing is an adventure activity that typically involves the descent of a deep ravine or watercourse that may be dry or wet. The defining factor is usually that the ravine is several times deeper than it is wide. All manner of walking, scrambling, climbing, swimming, plunging, jumping, bumslides or abseiling (rappelling) could be involved. 

A kloofing trip usually combines hiking with the descent of a watercourse.  Some of the more "interesting" kloofing involves long abseils or high jumps into pools from varying heights, up to as high as 20 or more metres (for example the popular 'Suicide Gorge' in South Africa).  Kloofing trips can take from as short as a few hours up to multi-day kloofing trips that would require a party to overnight in a ravine.

Depending on the nature of a particular trail a kloofer (noun) might require specialised technical equipment such as a rope, belay device, wetsuit, rock climbing anchors, etc. Every year a number of kloofers get injured or need rescue and hence kloofers need to take great care and preferably be accompanied by an experienced kloofer. 

The recommended technique for jumping into water is the 'pin drop', which involves hitting the water with your body as straight as possible and your hands held firmly by your sides.  Closing your mouth completely is a good idea (to avoid biting your tongue) and pointing your toes is optional.

Origin of the word
Kloofing is derived from the Afrikaans word 'kloof', meaning 'gorge' or 'ravine'.  It has been adopted by English-speaking people (mostly in southern Africa), to mean the activity described above. The word is used in a similar sense to canyoning and canyoneering. The word (and activity) has been in use in South Africa since about the 1920s and probably earlier.

Notes

  South Africa kloofing

Outdoor recreation